The IMOCA 60 Class yacht Delta Dore was designed by Farr Yacht Design and launched in the 2006 after being built JMV based in Cherbourg, France.

Racing Results

Timeline

Delta Dore

Bureau Vallee

Vers Un Monde Sans Sida

La Compagnie du Lit - Jiliti

References 

Individual sailing vessels
2000s sailing yachts
Sailing yachts designed by Farr Yacht Design
Vendée Globe boats
IMOCA 60